The 1943 Copa del Generalísimo is the 41st staging of Copa del Rey. It was organized by the Royal Spanish Football Federation. There were a total of 32 teams participating. The competition began on 25 April 1943 and concluded on 20 June 1943 with the final, where Athletic Bilbao won their 14th title.

First round

|}
 Tiebreaker

|}

Round of 16

|}
 Tiebreaker

|}

Quarter-finals

|}

Semi-finals

 

|}

Barcelona faced Real Madrid in the semi-finals of the 1943 Copa del Generalísimo. The first leg match, played at Barcelona's Les Corts stadium in Catalonia, ended with Barcelona winning 3–0. On 13 June 1943, Real Madrid beat Barcelona 11–1 in the second leg, advancing to the final 11–4 on aggregate.

Final

|}

References

Copa del Rey seasons
Copa del Rey
Copa